Robert Szreder (born 1946 in Dęblin) is a Polish violinist living in the Netherlands... He is also a violin pedagogue at Maastricht Academy of Music, works as a guest lecturer and gives masterclasses around the world.
Szreder was born in Dęblin (Poland) and studied under professor Zenon Brzewski at the Fryderyk Chopin University of Music. Amongst other competitions, won the Gaudeamus International Interpreters Award
Szreder has been awarded with the Polish Medal for Merit to Culture and the Officer’s Cross of the Order of Polonia Restituta

References 

1946 births
Living people
People from Lublin Voivodeship
Polish violinists
Polish expatriates in the Netherlands
21st-century violinists